The raising of the son of the woman of Shunem is a miracle by Elisha narrated in the Hebrew Bible, 2 Kings 4.

The story begins at 2 Kings 4:8, and is demarcated from the previous story by Elisha's arrival in Shunem, and by a change in heroine — from the widow of the son of the prophets (4:1-7) to the rich woman of Shunem.

References

Resurrection
Books of Kings
Women in the Hebrew Bible
Jewish miracles